Abdullah Muhammad Al-Saleh is a London-based Kuwaiti journalist, political talk show host and activist. He has been sentenced to 74 years in prison in Kuwait for criticizing Kuwait, Saudi Arabia, United Arab Emirates, Bahrain, and Oman.

Education
Al-Saleh studied at Kuwait English School from 1988 to 2001 and graduated IGCSE. He earned Bachelor's degree in Business administration and Marketing at the college of Business Administration in Kuwait University from 2001 to 2005 and Master's degree in Development studies at London South Bank University from 2009 to 2010.

He did PhD in Economic Development at London South Bank University from 2011 to 2015.

Career
Al-Saleh started his career as a marketing officer at Al Imtiaz Investment group in 2005, he then worked as a marketing and VIP clients officer at ADEEM Investment and Wealth Management Company in 2007. He then also worked as a VIP clients manager Al Najat Society from 2007 to 2009.

He also worked as a journalist for several magazines and newspapers in Kuwait including Al Anba newspaper, Al Watan newspaper, and  Al Jarida newspaper.

Al-Saleh also runs a political YouTube show that exposes corruption in the Gulf States.

Al-Saleh has been interviewed by various media TV channels and newspapers including BBC Arabic, Alarabiya and AlJazeera.

Political views
Al-Saleh was sentenced to 54 years in prison for criticising the leaders and governments of Kuwait, Saudi Arabia, United Arab Emirates, Bahrain, and Oman. He sought asylum in the UK at December 2017 which was endorsed by the Amnesty International. He was granted political refugee status by the 18th of March 2020. His case has been highlighted by the US Department of State report on the Human Rights of Kuwait.

In 2021, he leaked his alleged "phone call" with the Deputy of Royal Protocol in Kuwait  which resulted in controversy in the country. In the same year he was harassed by a member of the Royal family, .

References

Kuwaiti activists
Living people
1985 births
Kuwaiti YouTubers
Kuwaiti bloggers